Between 1977 and 2006, the Bristol-Myers Squibb Foundation presented annual awards of US$50,000 to scientists for distinguished achievements in fields such as cancer, infectious disease, neuroscience, nutrition, and cardiovascular disease. The recipients of these awards were selected by pre-eminent members of each field and past award recipients. Bristol-Myers Squibb had no role in determining the recipients of the awards.

Bristol-Myers Squibb Award for Distinguished Achievement in Cancer Research

Bristol-Myers Squibb Award for Distinguished Achievement in Nutrition Research

Bristol-Myers Squibb Award for Distinguished Achievement in Neuroscience Research

Bristol-Myers Squibb Award for Distinguished Achievement in Infectious Diseases Research

Bristol-Myers Squibb Award for Distinguished Achievement in Cardiovascular Research

Bristol-Myers Squibb Award for Distinguished Achievement in Metabolic Diseases Research

Bristol-Myers Squibb Award for Distinguished Achievement in Synthetic Organic Synthesis Research

See also

 List of chemistry awards
 List of medicine awards

References 

Medicine awards
Chemistry awards